In mathematics, the Gabriel–Popescu theorem is an embedding theorem for certain abelian categories, introduced by . It characterizes certain abelian categories (the Grothendieck categories) as quotients of module categories.

Theorem
Let A be a Grothendieck category (an AB5 category with a generator), G a generator of A and R be the ring of endomorphisms of G; also, let S be the
functor from A to Mod-R (the category of right R-modules) defined by S(X) = Hom(G,X). Then the Gabriel–Popescu theorem states that S is full and faithful and has an exact left adjoint.

This implies that A is equivalent to the Serre quotient category of Mod-R by a certain localizing subcategory C. (A localizing subcategory of Mod-R is a full subcategory C of Mod-R, closed under arbitrary direct sums, such that for any short exact sequence of modules , we have M2 in C if and only if M1 and M3 are in C. The Serre quotient of Mod-R by any localizing subcategory is a Grothendieck category.) We may take C to be the kernel of the left adjoint of the functor S.

Note that the embedding S of A into Mod-R is left-exact but not necessarily right-exact: cokernels of morphisms in A do not in general correspond to the cokernels of the corresponding morphisms in Mod-R.

References

 [Remark: "Popescu" is spelled "Popesco" in French.]

External links

Category theory
Functors
Theorems in abstract algebra